Yevgeny Ivanovich Tolstikov (9 February 1913 – 3 December 1987) was a Soviet polar explorer who was awarded the title Hero of the Soviet Union in 1955 for heading the station "North Pole 4" for a year starting in April 1954. He led the Third Soviet Antarctic Expedition and one of the first manned drifting ice stations in the Arctic.

After the expedition he worked as deputy chief of the State Committee for Hydrometeorological Service Management.

A minor planet 3357 Tolstikov discovered by Czech astronomer Antonín Mrkos in 1984 is named after him.

References

1913 births
1987 deaths
Heroes of the Soviet Union
Recipients of the Order of Lenin
Soviet polar explorers
Soviet scientists
Soviet explorers